Osiedle Paderewskiego–Muchowiec is a district of Katowice. It has an area of 7.42 km2 and in 2007 had 12,253 inhabitants.

Notable places:
Katowice-Muchowiec Airport

References

Districts of Katowice